Antoinette Cellier, Lady Seton (23 June 1913 – 18 January 1981) was an English film and theatre actress.

Early life and education

She was born in Florence Antoinette Glossop Cellier in Broadstairs, Kent, England. Her father, Frank Cellier, was a film and theatre actor, and her mother was Florence Glossop-Harris. Her grandparents included Augustus Harris, the actor-manager, and François Cellier, musical director of the Savoy Theatre. Her half-brother Peter Cellier also became a film, television and theatre actor.

Cellier was trained at the Royal Academy of Dramatic Art in London.

In 1940, she became the second wife of actor Sir Bruce Lovat Seton, 11th Baronet of Abercorn.

Career
She made her stage début in London's West End theatre in Firebird. Her first film was Music Hath Charms (1935).

Filmography
Late Extra (1935)
Music Hath Charms (1935)
 Royal Cavalcade (1935)
The Tenth Man (1936)
Ourselves Alone (1936)
 Death Croons the Blues (1937)
 The Great Barrier (1937)
The Gables Mystery (1938)
 Lucky to Me (1939)
I Killed the Count (1939)
 At the Villa Rose (1940)
Dear Octopus (1943)
 Headline (1943)
 Bees in Paradise (1944)
The End of the River (1947)

Death
Cellier died 18 January 1981, age 67, in London.

References

External links

Cellier family
1913 births
1981 deaths
Alumni of RADA
English film actresses
English stage actresses
Actresses from London
People from Broadstairs
Actresses from Kent
20th-century English actresses
Wives of baronets